Oshdalaq-e Olya (also Romanized as Oshdalaq-e ‘Olyā; also known as Ashdalaq-e Bālā, Oshtelaghé Olya, Oshtelaq-e Bālā, Oshtolaq Bālā, Oshtolaq-e ‘Olyā, Oshtoq-e ‘Olyā, Ūshdelī-ye Bālā, Ūshdelī-ye Tāzeh, and Ushtulia) is a village in Mehranrud-e Markazi Rural District, in the Central District of Bostanabad County, East Azerbaijan Province, Iran. At the 2006 census, its population was 1,013, in 196 families.

References 

Populated places in Bostanabad County